Adam Pattison (born 5 March 1986) is a professional Australian rules footballer and Ruckman for Hawthorn Football Club in the Australian Football League (AFL).

He began his career with Richmond, before moving to St Kilda for the 2010 season.

AFL career 

Pattison played for Richmond from 2005 to 2009.  He was delisted by the Tigers on 30 October 2009 and was then selected by the St Kilda Football Club in the national draft, with pick number 64, on 26 November 2009. He was delisted after spending one season and five games with St Kilda.

Pattison spent 2011 playing with the Box Hill Hawks. He showed enough for Hawthorn to pick him in the 2011 Rookie Draft.

External links

Richmond Football Club players
St Kilda Football Club players
Box Hill Football Club players
Living people
1986 births
Northern Knights players
Old Paradians Amateur Football Club players
Australian rules footballers from Victoria (Australia)